Q. Wang may refer to:

Qiudong Wang, professor of mathematics
Q. Wang (artist) (born 1962), Chinese-American primitivist painter